The Sha Tau Kok River (Hong Kong Hakka: Sa1tiu2gok5 Ho2), is a river between Hong Kong and Shenzhen serving as a part of the land border between Hong Kong SAR and Mainland China.

Along with Sham Chun River and Chung Ying Street, the river serves as the natural boundary between the Special Administrative Region of Hong Kong and the Special Economic Zone of Shenzhen. It is situated at the northeastern corner of North District, Hong Kong and the southeastern corner of Shenzhen, Guangdong. It flows from its source at the Sham Chun River near Pak Kung Au and eastward into Starling Inlet, which is then connected to Mirs Bay.

See also
 List of rivers and nullahs in Hong Kong

References

External links
 Rivers of Hong Kong 

Sha Tau Kok
Rivers of Guangdong
Geography of Shenzhen
Borders of Hong Kong